Andrej Martin took the title, beating Horacio Zeballos 1–6, 6–1, 6–4

Seeds

Draw

Finals

Top half

Bottom half

References
 Main Draw
 Qualifying Draw

Singles
2014